Cabrini–Green Homes was a Chicago Housing Authority (CHA) public housing project on the Near North Side of Chicago, Illinois. The Frances Cabrini Rowhouses and Extensions were south of Division Street, bordered by Larrabee Street to the west, Orleans Street to the east and Chicago Avenue to the south, with the William Green Homes to the northwest.

At its peak, Cabrini–Green was home to 15,000 people, mostly living in mid- and high-rise apartment buildings. Crime and neglect created hostile living conditions for many residents, and "Cabrini–Green" became a metonym for problems associated with public housing in the United States. In 1995, CHA began tearing down dilapidated mid- and high-rise buildings, with the last demolished in 2011. Today, only the original two-story rowhouses remain.

The area has seen major redevelopment due to its proximity to downtown, resulting in a combination of upscale high-rises and townhouses, with some units being CHA-owned, creating a mixed-income neighborhood.

Layout and demographics
The construction reflected the urban renewal approach to United States city planning in the mid-20th century. The extension buildings were known as the "Reds" for their red brick exteriors, while the Green Homes, with reinforced concrete exteriors, were known as the "Whites". Many of the high-rise buildings originally had exterior porches (called "open galleries"). According to the CHA, the early residents of the Cabrini row houses were predominantly of Italian ancestry. By 1962, however, a majority of residents in the completed complex were black.

Timeline

1850: Shanties were first built on low-lying land along Chicago River; the population was predominantly Swedish, then Irish. The area acquires the "Little Hell" nickname due to a nearby gas refinery, which produced shooting pillars of flame and various noxious fumes. By the 20th century, it was known as "Little Sicily" due to large numbers of Sicilian immigrants.
1929: Harvey Zorbaugh writes "The Gold Coast and the Slum: A Sociological Study of Chicago's Near North Side", contrasting the widely varying social mores of the wealthy Gold Coast, the poor Little Sicily, and the transitional area in between. Marshall Field Garden Apartments, the first large-scale (although funded through private charity) low-income housing development in area, is completed.
1942: Frances Cabrini Homes (two-story rowhouses), with 586 units in 54 buildings by architects Holsman, Burmeister, et al., is completed. Initial regulations stipulate 75% White and 25% Black residents. (Named for Saint Frances Cabrini, an Italian-American nun who served the poor and was the first American to be canonized.)
1957: Cabrini Homes Extension (red brick mid- and high-rises), with 1,925 units in 15 buildings by architects A. Epstein & Sons, is completed.
1962: William Green Homes (1,096 units, north of Division Street) by architects Pace Associates is completed. (Named for William Green, longtime president of the American Federation of Labor.)
1966: Gautreaux et al. vs. Chicago Housing Authority, a lawsuit alleging that Chicago's public housing program was conceived and executed in a racially discriminatory manner that perpetuated racial segregation within neighborhoods, is filed. CHA was found liable in 1969, and a consent decree with HUD was entered in 1981.
February 8, 1974: Television sitcom Good Times, ostensibly set in the Cabrini–Green projects (though the projects were never actually referred to as "Cabrini-Green" on camera), and featuring shots of the complex in the opening and closing credits, debuts on CBS. It ran for six seasons, until August 1, 1979.
March 26 – April 19, 1981: Mayor Jane Byrne moves into Cabrini–Green to prove a point regarding Chicago's high crime rate. Considered a publicity stunt, she stays just three weeks.
1992: The horror film Candyman is released, the story taking place at the housing project.
1994: Chicago receives one of the first HOPE VI (Housing Opportunities for People Everywhere) grants to redevelop Cabrini–Green as a mixed-income neighborhood.
September 27, 1995: Demolition begins.
1997: Chicago unveils Near North Redevelopment Initiative, a master plan for development in the area. It recommends demolishing Green Homes and most of Cabrini Extension.
1999: Chicago Housing Authority announces Plan for Transformation, which will spend $1.5 billion over ten years to demolish 18,000 apartments and build and/or rehabilitate 25,000 apartments. Earlier redevelopment plans for Cabrini–Green are included in the Plan for Transformation. New library, rehabilitated Seward Park, and new shopping center open.
December 9, 2010: The William Green Homes complex's last standing building closes.
March 30, 2011: the last high-rise building was demolished, with a public art presentation commemorating the event.  The majority of Frances Cabrini Homes row houses remain intact, although in poor condition, with some having been abandoned.

Overview 

Cabrini–Green was composed of 10 sections built over a 20-year period: the Frances Cabrini Rowhouses (586 units in 1942), Cabrini Extension North and Cabrini Extension South (1,925 units in 1957), and the William Green Homes (1,096 units in 1962) (see Chronology below). As of May 3, 2011, all the high-rise buildings had been demolished. One hundred and fifty of the dilapidated Frances Cabrini Rowhomes (south of Oak Street, north of Chicago Avenue, west of Hudson Avenue, and east of Cambridge Street) have been renovated and remain inhabited.

Crime and response

Problems develop

Poverty and organized crime have long been associated with the area: a 1931 "map of Chicago's gangland" by Bruce-Roberts, Incorporated notes Oak Street and Milton Avenue (now Cleveland Avenue) as "Death Corner" (captioned "50 murders: count 'em"). At first, the housing was integrated and many residents held jobs. This changed in the years after World War II, when the nearby factories that provided the neighborhood's economic base closed and thousands were laid off. At the same time, the cash-strapped city began withdrawing crucial services like police patrols, transit services, and routine building maintenance.

Lawns were paved over to save on maintenance, failed lights were left for months, and apartments damaged by fire were simply boarded up instead of rehabilitated and reoccupied. Later phases of public housing development (such as the Green Homes, the newest of the Cabrini–Green buildings) were built on extremely tight budgets and suffered from maintenance problems due to the low quality of construction.

Unlike many of the city's other public housing projects such as Rockwell Gardens or Robert Taylor Homes, Cabrini-Green was situated in an affluent part of the city. The poverty-stricken projects were actually constructed at the meeting point of Chicago's two wealthiest neighborhoods, Lincoln Park and the Gold Coast. Less than a mile to the east sat Michigan Avenue with its high-end shopping and expensive housing. Specific gangs controlled individual buildings, and residents felt pressure to ally with those gangs in order to protect themselves from escalating violence.

During the worst years of Cabrini-Green's problems, vandalism increased substantially. Gang members and other vandals covered interior walls with graffiti and damaged doors, windows, and elevators. Rat and cockroach infestations were commonplace, rotting garbage stacked up in clogged trash chutes (it once piled up to the 15th floor), and basic utilities (water, electricity, etc.) often malfunctioned and were left in disrepair.

On the exterior, boarded-up windows, burned-out areas of the façade, and pavement instead of green space—all in the name of economizing on maintenance—created an atmosphere of decay and government neglect. The balconies were fenced in to prevent residents from emptying garbage cans into the yard, and from falling or being thrown to their deaths. This created the appearance of a large prison tier, or of animal cages, which further enraged community leaders of the residents.

Brother Bill

In the 1980s, a Catholic lay worker, William "Brother Bill" Tomes Jr., frequently visited Cabrini–Green in an effort to stop the violence. His efforts received national attention and he was interviewed by Time magazine and several television networks.

Tenant activism

Residents organized over the years both to pressure the city for assistance and to protect and support each other. Community leader Marion Stamps was the most visible Cabrini tenant to organize strikes and protests against the Chicago Housing Authority, Mayor of Chicago and many others on behalf of Cabrini residents from the 1960s until her death in 1996. In 1996, the federal government mandated the destruction of 18,000 units of public housing in Chicago (along with tens of thousands of other units nationwide).

Some Cabrini–Green tenant activists organized to prevent themselves from becoming homeless and to protect what they and their supporters saw as a right to public housing for the city's poorest residents. The activists succeeded in obtaining a consent decree guaranteeing that some buildings will remain standing while the new structures are built, so that tenants can remain in their homes until new ones are available. The document also guarantees displaced Cabrini residents a home in the new neighborhood.

In 2001, a tenants group sued the CHA over relocation plans for displaced residents of Cabrini–Green under the city's Plan for Transformation, a $1.4 billion blueprint for public housing renewal. Richard Wheelock, an attorney representing the tenants, said the authority's demolition program had outpaced its reconstruction program, thus leaving families with their own responsibilities to find options beyond equally dangerous and segregated areas elsewhere in the city, or simply to become homeless.

In 1997, the same year as the attack on Girl X, community leaders formed the Alliance for Community Peace for "mentoring and recreation to area youth" which later expanded citywide.

Recent history and plans
While Cabrini–Green was deteriorating during the postwar era, causing industry, investment, and residents to abandon its immediate surroundings, the rest of Chicago's Near North Side underwent equally dramatic upward changes in socioeconomic status. First, downtown employment shifted dramatically from manufacturing to professional services, spurring increased demand for middle-income housing; the resulting gentrification spread north along the lakefront from the Gold Coast, then pushed west and eventually crossed the river.

Then, in the 1980s, the Lower North Side industrial area just across the river from the Loop, west of Michigan Avenue, and south of Near North Side's Cabrini–Green was transformed into the "River North" neighborhood, a focus of arts and entertainment, now home to the city's technology sector. By the 1990s, developers had converted thousands of acres of former industrial lands near the north branch of the Chicago River (and directly north, south, and west of the former Cabrini–Green projects) to lucrative office, retail, and housing developments.

Over time, Cabrini–Green's location became increasingly desirable to private developers. Speculators began purchasing property immediately adjacent to the projects, with the expectation that the complex would eventually be demolished. Finally, in May 1995, the federal Department of Housing and Urban Development (HUD) took over management of the CHA and almost immediately began demolishing the first of the vacant "Reds" buildings in Cabrini Extension, intending to make Chicago a showpiece of a new, mixed-income approach to public housing. Shortly thereafter, in June 1996, the city of Chicago and the CHA unveiled the Near North Redevelopment Initiative, which called for new development on and around the Cabrini–Green site. Under a ten-year Plan for Transformation, which was officially enacted in 2000, the city plans to demolish almost all of its high-rise public housing, including much of Cabrini–Green, except for a few of the run-down row houses, which tentatively remain.

Demolition of Cabrini Extension was completed in 2002. Part of the site was added to Seward Park, and construction of new, mixed-income housing on the remainder of the site began in 2006. Subsidized development of mixed-income housing on vacant or underused parcels adjacent to Cabrini–Green, including a long-shuttered Oscar Mayer sausage factory, the former headquarters of Montgomery Ward, and an adjacent senior housing project named Orchard Park, began in 1994.

New market-rate housing now almost completely surrounds the remaining public housing. Cabrini–Green once housed 15,000 residents. New housing built on the  Cabrini–Green site will include 30% public-housing replacement homes and 20% "workforce affordable" housing, while many adjacent developments (almost all targeted at luxury buyers) include 20% affordable housing, half targeted as public-housing replacement, with a goal of 505 replacement units built off-site.

In February 2006, a unique partnership between CHA, Holsten, Kimball Hill Urban Centers and the Cabrini–Green LAC Community Development Corporation began a 790-unit, $250-million redevelopment of the  Cabrini Extension site, to be called Parkside at Old Town. Plans completed the  demolition of Green Homes in 2011, while the majority of Cabrini's dilapidated row houses are abandoned and slated for demolition and future redevelopment. The Plan for Transformation's relocation process was the subject of a lawsuit, Wallace v. Chicago Housing Authority, which alleged that many residents were hastily forced into substandard, "temporary" housing in other slums, did not receive promised social services during or after the move, and were often denied the promised opportunity to return to the redeveloped sites.

The lawsuit was settled in June 2006, as the parties agreed to two relocation programs for current and former CHA residents: (1) CHA's current relocation program, encouraging moves to racially integrated areas of metropolitan Chicago and providing for case-managed social services, would be applied to families initially moving from public housing; and (2) an agreed-upon modified program run by CHA's voucher administrator, CHAC Inc., would encourage former CHA residents to relocate to economically and racially integrated communities as well as give them increased access to social services.

Some former CHA residents have moved out of Chicago to nearby south suburbs such as Harvey or to other housing developments in nearby cities.  New residents have successfully moved into CHA replacement housing, and to date, residents of the mixed-income developments have reported fewer crime related problems. The last two families in Cabrini–Green were forced out by a federal judge's decree on December 1, 2010.

Crime has dramatically decreased as the area's black population has shifted; in the first half of 2006, only one murder occurred. Demolition of Cabrini–Green continued slowly and was completed in 2011. Plaintiffs in Wallace and others allege that CHA's hasty removal of residents has exacerbated socioeconomic and racial segregation, homelessness, and other social ills that the Plan for Transformation aimed to address by forcing residents to less-visible but still impoverished neighborhoods, largely on the south and west sides of the city.

Retail chain Target has built on the site at Division and Larrabee Streets, formerly occupied by 1230 N. Larrabee Street and 624 W. Division Street high-rises of the Green Homes.  The new address is at 1200 N. Larrabee, and it opened to the public in October 2013.

Reputation

Though Chicago has had a number of notorious public housing projects, including the Robert Taylor Homes and  Stateway Gardens on the South Side, and Rockwell Gardens and the Henry Horner Homes on the West Side, Cabrini–Green's name and its problems were the most publicized, especially beyond Chicago. Cabrini–Green often gained press coverage for its chaotic New Year's Eve celebrations when gang members fired handguns into the air, causing police to block off nearby streets every year. Several infamous incidents contributed to Cabrini–Green's reputation.

An unanticipated result of the steel fencing installed to secure the previously open gangways at Cabrini–Green was that it became difficult for Chicago police officers to see through the steel mesh from outside. On July 17, 1970, Chicago police patrolman Anthony N. Rizzato and Sergeant James Severin were shot and killed by gang members while patrolling community housing for an all-volunteer "Walk and Talk" project. As the officers proceeded across the Cabrini–Green baseball field, the assailants opened fire from an apartment window. The purpose of the shooting was to seal a pact between two rival gangs. Both officers were killed in the attack. Three adults and one juvenile were later charged with murder. The two shooters were sentenced to 100–199 years in prison for two counts of murder. In 1981, the gang killings of 11 made national attention.

In March 1981, in an effort to demonstrate a commitment to making the complex safer, then-Chicago Mayor Jane Byrne moved into a fourth-floor apartment in the 1160 N. Sedgwick Street building with her husband. Backed by a number of police officers and a substantial personal bodyguard presence, she stayed for only three weeks, and this incident contributed to public perception of Cabrini–Green as the worst of the worst of public housing. As a security measure, the rear entryway of the unit Byrne stayed in was welded shut. This had the impact of creating a fortification for gang members when Byrne left. Many other gangs copied this technique in other units.

On October 13, 1992, seven-year-old Dantrell Davis was shot in the head and killed by a sniper's  bullet while walking to Jenner Elementary School with his mother.

On January 9, 1997, a nine-year-old girl nicknamed "Girl X" was raped, poisoned, and strangled in a stairwell of the 1121 N. Larrabee Street building, leaving her permanently blind, paralyzed, and mute due to brain damage. The attacker used a marker to scrawl gang symbols on her abdomen in an attempt to mislead any investigation and left her for dead, face down in the snow, in the dangerously unlit corridor to be found by a janitor who quit the same day. Patrick Sykes, a neighboring 25-year-old male who was not a gang member, was later apprehended by police, gave a detailed confession, and was sentenced to the state maximum of 120 years in prison. 

Two Chicago reporters soon indicted the Chicago community's indifference to its living conditions and cited Girl X, and her case was contrasted with that of the white and affluent JonBenét Ramsey. Girl X testified in a court case four years after the attack. The judge, Joseph Urso, awarded the family a $3 million payment by the Chicago Housing Authority on the grounds of negligence of maintenance and security of the facility, with the money dedicated to the child's long-term care.

Though many nonresidents regarded Cabrini–Green with almost unalloyed horror, long-term residents interviewed by a Chicago Tribune reporter in 2004 described mixed feelings about the end of the Cabrini–Green era. They told the reporter that, in the face of their hardships living in such squalor, many residents had developed bonds of community and mutual support. They lamented the uprooting and scattering of that community, and worried about what would become of the residents who were being relocated to make way for urban redevelopment. Local Little League baseball coach Daniel Coyle wrote a book Hardball: A Season in the Projects (1994), summarizing the blight and violence as "That's the story of Cabrini. A well-meaning person shows up three times a week. But nothing changes."

Education

Chicago Public Schools (CPS) operates public schools in the area around Cabrini-Green. Most of the Cabrini–Green teenagers attended William H. Wells High School, Waller High School (now known as Lincoln Park High School), also serves area students. Near North Career Metropolitan High School, located at Larrabee and Blackhawk, evolved from Cooley Vocational High School and served area students from 1979 until 2001.

At Cabrini–Green's height when over 15,000 residents lived in the neighborhood, there were five neighborhood elementary schools operated by Chicago Public Schools serving the neighborhood: Richard E. Byrd Community Academy, Jenner Academy of the Arts, Manierre School, Schiller Community Academy, and Truth School.

In the 1970–1971 school year, there were 6,144 students attending five grade schools in Cabrini-Green: Cooley Upper Grade Center, and Byrd, Jenner, Manierre, and Schiller elementary schools. By 1997 Cooley Upper had closed, and by that year the combined enrollment of the remaining four schools was 2,361. Between the 1970s and 1997 two high-rise buildings were demolished, family sizes decreased, more apartment units became vacant, and the demographic makeup of residents became more proportionately of adults. As of 2008, only three of the schools remain in use.  only Manierre and Jenner remained as K–8 schools.

K–8 schools
Cabrini-Green is served by Ogden International School, which has its preschool and middle school campus in the Cabrini-Green area. Prior to 2018 the building housed the standalone K-8 school Jenner Academy of the Arts (K-8). In 2016 it had 239 students, 98% African-American and almost all low income; its building capacity was 1,060. Enrollment had declined after Cabrini-Green was demolished. Jenner began the process of merging into Ogden International.

In the 2010s CPS considered merging Jenner and Manierre together, but concerns involving students crossing gang territorial lines meant that both schools remained open. Manierre is in "Sedville", a gang territory area in Old Town.  it is considered a low performing school.

During the 2003–2004 school year, fifth-grade students from Room 405 at Richard E. Byrd Community Academy developed a comprehensive action plan to push the City of Chicago and the Chicago Board of Education to fulfill an old promise of building a new school for the community. They cited that their school had no lunchroom, no gym, and no auditorium. The heat often did not work and students were forced to wear hats, gloves, and coats in the classroom, among many other inadequacies. As they researched reasons for the decrepit and shameful conditions of their school, they examined issues related to equity in school funding.

To further their cause and implement their plan, the young activists wrote letters and emails, surveyed, petitioned, interviewed legislators, developed and produced a DVD, video documentaries, and a website in an effort to "get the word out" and garner support in hopes of seeing the new school built. Their fight for the new building garnered local and national attention. In 2004 Byrd students were rezoned to Jenner and Byrd closed. As of 2008, the school's students have transferred to other schools in the Chicago area and the school has been left vacant.

Freidrich von Schiller School served the William Green Homes. Initially it occupied two buildings at 640 West Scott Street; one was built circa 1963 and the other was about one century old. In 1969 the city approved the site for the new Schiller. It was planned as a two-building campus on a  plot of land, with an expected cost of $2.5 million. It was scheduled to open in September 1970. Initially the school was to designate one of its buildings as a "Schome" (meaning "school-home") for preschool children while another building was to house elementary grades. The campus was scheduled to have a capacity of 1,635. In 2009 Schiller closed and students were redirected to Jenner. Skinner North, a selective enrollment (or "test-in") school, occupies the building formerly held by Schiller Elementary.

Notable people
Curtis Mayfield, soul musician.
Jerry Butler, soul singer.
Terry Callier, soul musician.
Eddie T. Johnson, police superintendent.
 Major Lance, R&B singer and father of Atlanta mayor Keisha Lance Bottoms
 Polo G, rapper
 Greg Hollimon, comedic actor

In popular culture

Film
 The opening shot and many scenes in the 1975 film Cooley High take place at the Cabrini–Green Homes, and the film portrays the lives of young people in those projects. The film's creator, Eric Monte, was raised at Cabrini–Green Homes and attended the real-life Cooley Vocational High School.
 In the 1992 horror film Candyman, Cabrini–Green appears as the focal point of the titular character's supernatural activity.
 The 2001 movie Hardball was filmed there.
 The documentary 70 Acres in Chicago, about Cabrini–Green by Ronit Bezalel, who spent two decades there beginning in 1995 was screened at the Gene Siskel Film Center in 2015.
 William Gates, one of the two subjects of the 1994 Kartemquin Films documentary Hoop Dreams, was a resident of Cabrini-Green.

Television
 In the television series Boss, Cabrini–Green serves as the inspiration and filming location for the "Lennox Gardens" housing project.

See also 

 Pruitt-Igoe, St. Louis, Missouri
 Vladeck Houses, Manhattan, New York City 
 Parkchester, The Bronx, New York City 
 Broadwater Farm, London, England
 Red Road Flats, Glasgow, Scotland 
 Ballymun Flats, Dublin, Ireland
 Towers in the park

References

Further reading
  Memoir of a childhood at Cabrini–Green.
  Poetry by a former resident of Cabrini–Green.
 Cabrini Green
 Cabrini–Green in Words and Pictures (2000). .
 Dizikes, Peter, "Chicago hope: Ambitious attempt to help the city's poor by moving them out of troubled housing projects is having mixed results, MIT study finds", MIT News, MIT News Office, March 3, 2011.
 "Cross The Bridge" by author and Cabrini resident Pete (K-SO G) Keller.
 "Gang Leader For A Day" By Sudhir Venkatesh
 The Paw Print. Walter Payton H.S., February 2009. Special Issue on Cabrini–Green.

External links

 Residents' Journal—written, produced & distributed by Chicago Public Housing residents; archives contain many articles on activism at Cabrini–Green, particularly around the plans for redevelopment
 Chicago Coalition to Protect Public Housing
 Voices of Cabrini—Documentary film by Ronit Bezalel
 70 Acres in Chicago: Cabrini Green -a film by Ronit Bezalel and a follow up to Voices of Cabrini.  
 Frances Cabrini Rowhouses 2010–2013 Photography by Satoki Nagata
 Chicago Tribune: Cabrini–Green Columns
 North Town Park site plan (redevelopment of Cabrini Extension site)
 Encyclopedia of Chicago entry on Chicago Housing Authority

Public housing in Chicago
Central Chicago
Neighborhoods in Chicago
Residential buildings completed in 1942
Residential buildings completed in 1958
Residential buildings completed in 1962
Demolished buildings and structures in Chicago
Former buildings and structures in Chicago
Urban decay in the United States
Italian-American culture in Chicago
Articles containing video clips
1942 establishments in Illinois
2011 disestablishments in Illinois